This is a round-up of the 1981 Sligo Senior Football Championship. St. Mary's completed the three-in-a-row in the repeat of the 1980 final, albeit with a smaller winning margin. Eastern Harps would be relegated from Senior football this year, after a poor league campaign, despite successive Championship final appearances. St. Mary's later won their second Connacht title, following on this Championship win.

Quarter finals

Semi-finals

Sligo Senior Football Championship Final

References

 Sligo Champion (July–August 1981)

Sligo Senior Football Championship
Sligo Senior Football Championship